Saint Andrew West is a parliamentary constituency represented in the House of Representatives of the Jamaican Parliament. It elects one Member of Parliament MP by the first past the post system of election. It is represented by Anthony Hylton of the Jamaica Labour Party.

Boundaries 

Includes the Cyprus Hall, Plantation Heights, Ferry, New Haven, Duhaney Park, Coorville Gardens, Washington Gardens, Callaloo Mews, Riverton, the western parts of Waterhouse, Seaview Gardens and Hunts Bay Lane.

References

Parliamentary constituencies of Jamaica